The following is a list of awards and nominations received by English screenwriter and film director Steven Knight.

Major associations

Academy Awards

British Academy Film Awards

Other associations

British Independent Film Awards

British Screenwriters’ Awards

Chlotrudis Awards

Christopher Award

David di Donatello Awards

Edgar Award

European Film Awards

Evening Standard British Film Awards

Genie Awards

Gothenburg Film Festival

Humanitas Prize

International Online Cinema Awards

Italian Online Movie Awards

London Film Critics' Circle

Los Angeles Film Critics Association

New York Film Critics Circle

Online Film & Television Association

Online Film Critics Society

Royal Television Society

San Diego Film Critics Society

Sarasota Film Festival

Satellite Awards

St. Louis Film Critics Association

Sydney Film Festival

Washington D.C. Area Film Critics Association

Writers Guild of America

Writers' Guild of Great Britain

References

External links
 

Knight, Steven, list of awards and nominations received by
Knight, Steven, list of awards and nominations received by